Kenneth Jermaine Mixon (born May 31, 1975) is a former National Football League (NFL) defensive end for the Minnesota Vikings and the Miami Dolphins.

High school career
Mixon attended Pineville High School in Pineville, Louisiana.  While there, he was an All-District selection, the District M.V.P., an All-State pick, and he won Central Louisiana Player of the Year honors. He was also a track and field star, competing in the shot put, and was a hurdler.

College career
Mixon attended Louisiana State University, where he completed his career with 10 sacks, 100 tackles, 1 fumble recovery, and 1 forced fumble.

Professional career
Mixon began his career with Miami Dolphins in 1998, being selected in the 2nd round of the NFL Draft, 49th overall.   He has played with the Vikings since 2002.

In August 2004, Mixon was suspended by the NFL for two games for violating the league's substance abuse policy after being convicted of DUI. In April 2005, he was released by the Vikings.

NFL statistics

References

Kenny Mixon player page, NFL.com.
"NFL rejects Mixon's appeal, ESPN.com, August 25, 2004.

1975 births
Living people
American football defensive ends
LSU Tigers football players
Miami Dolphins players
Minnesota Vikings players
Players of American football from Los Angeles
People from Sun Valley, Los Angeles